Friendly Beaches is a rural locality in the local government area of Glamorgan–Spring Bay in the South-east region of Tasmania. The 2016 census has a population of 10 for the state suburb of Friendly Beaches.

History
Friendly Beaches is a confirmed suburb/locality.

Geography
The eastern boundary of Friendly Beaches is the Tasman Sea. The Friendly Beaches Reserve is within the locality.

Road infrastructure
The C302 route (Coles Bay Road) enters from the north-west and runs through to the south-west, where it exits.

References

Localities of Glamorgan–Spring Bay Council
Towns in Tasmania